The 1992 NCAA men's volleyball tournament was the 23rd annual tournament to determine the national champion of NCAA men's collegiate volleyball. The tournament was played at the John E. Worthen Arena in Muncie, Indiana during May 1992.

Pepperdine defeated Stanford in the final match, 3–0 (15–7, 15–13, 16–14), to win their fourth national title. The Waves (24–4) were coached by Marv Dunphy.

Pepperdine's Alon Grinberg was named the tournament's Most Outstanding Player. Grinberg, along with five other players, comprised the All-Tournament Team.

Qualification
Until the creation of the NCAA Men's Division III Volleyball Championship in 2012, there was only a single national championship for men's volleyball. As such, all NCAA men's volleyball programs, whether from Division I, Division II, or Division III, were eligible. A total of 4 teams were invited to contest this championship.

Tournament bracket 
Site: John E. Worthen Arena, Muncie, Indiana

All tournament team 
Alon Grinberg, Pepperdine (Most outstanding player)
Tom Soreson, Pepperdine
Chip McCaw, Pepperdine
Dave Goss, Stanford
Duncan Blackman, Stanford
David Muir, Penn State

See also 
 NCAA Men's National Collegiate Volleyball Championship
 NCAA Women's Volleyball Championships (Division I, Division II, Division III)

References

NCAA Men's Volleyball Tournament
NCAA Men's Volleyball Championship
NCAA Men's Volleyball Championship
Ncaa Mens Volleyball Tournament
Volleyball in Indiana